Madeji is a town in Garhi Yasin Taluka of Shikarpur District, in Sindh. The town is situated in east, at a distance of 68 kilometers from World Heritage Site Moen-jo-Daro. The town market is considered as the central market for all nearby villages.

A grid station of 132KV was inaugurated in city on Tuesday, February 2, 2016.

References 

Populated places in Shikarpur District